The first libraries in China came into being during the time of the Shang dynasty (the sixteenth to eleventh centuries B.C.) as intellectuals known as the Shi (historians) and Wu (diviners) emerged from manual labor to special occupations for the creation and spread of culture. Among the documents that these occupations managed were "the country's statute books, genealogies of imperial kinsmen, issued notices and orders, and recorded important events and natural phenomena. For future verification and reference, they built storehouses to keep records in different media. To meet the needs of more and more complicated affairs and to ensure easy use, they began to collect and sort out those records according to chronological order and category. Thus, the earliest library in China came into being. The numerous kinds of media loaded with information and knowledge emerged in human society, resulting in the concepts of preservation and collection. Accordingly, the earliest libraries and archives were the result of conscious collection, process, coalition, and utilization."

Early in the history of China, scholars had extensive private libraries, and all of the imperial dynasties constructed libraries and archives to house literary treasures and official records. These early private libraries acted more as book repositories than libraries. The actions of book repositories were often limited to basic functions such as collecting, preserving, and compiling books. There were four major types of book repositories in the Qing Dynasty (1636 AD–1911 AD): Government, private, academy (shuyuan), and temple book repositories. The first modern libraries, however, did not appear in China until the late nineteenth century; even then, library service grew slowly and sporadically. In 1949 there were only fifty-five public libraries at the county level and above, most concentrated in major coastal commercial centers.

Following the founding of the People's Republic, government and education leaders strove to develop library services and make them available throughout the country. The National Book Coordination Act of 1957 authorized the establishment of two national library centers, one in Beijing (National Library of China) and the other in Shanghai (Shanghai Library), and nine regional library networks. Even so, libraries still were scarce, and those facilities that were available were cramped and offered only rudimentary services. Seeing the lack of libraries as a major impediment to modernization efforts, government leaders in the early 1980s took special interest in the development of library services. The special concentration of funds and talent began to produce significant results. More than forty Chinese institutions of higher learning also had established library science or information science departments. There were more than 2,300 public libraries at the county level and above, containing nearly 256 million volumes, and below the county level some 53,000 cultural centers included a small library or reading room.

At the end of 2004, China had 2,710 public libraries with a collection of over 400 million copies. There were 2,925 public libraries in China in 2011. Of the university or college libraries, the collections of Peking University and Zhejiang University libraries lead the nation. The national library network also includes scientific research institution libraries, trade union libraries, plus libraries and reading rooms attached to government institutions, army units, primary and secondary schools, townships, enterprises and local communities.

National Library

The country's main library, the National Library of China, housed a rich collection of books, periodicals, newspapers, maps, prints, photographs, manuscripts, microforms, tape recordings, and inscriptions on bronze, stone, bones, and tortoiseshells.

The National Library of China, with a collection of over 26 million volumes, is the largest library in Asia, housing the largest collection of Chinese books in the world. In the library's collection are over 35,000 oracle bones and tortoise shells carved with ancient Chinese characters, 1.6 million volumes of traditional thread-bound books, over 16,000 volumes of documents from Dunhuang Grottoes, 12 million volumes of foreign-language books, and dozens of electronic databases.

The library started to accept the submissions of official national publications in 1916, becoming the main national database; and began to accept submissions of domestic electronic publications in 1987. It is also the country's ISSN (International Standard Serial Number) Center and Network Information Center. At present, the National Library of China has formed a digital library alliance with some 90 other libraries around the country, making joint efforts in promoting the development and application of China's digital public information service. The second phase of the National Library – China Digital Library, whose foundation was laid at the end of 2004, is planned to be completed and commissioned in October 2007. The expanded library will be able to meet book storage demand for the next 30 years. The Digital Library will make it the world's biggest Chinese literature collection center and digital resources base, as well as the most advanced network service base in China.

Other libraries 
The Shanghai Municipal Library, one of the largest public libraries in the country, contained over 7 million volumes, nearly 1 million of which were in foreign languages. The Shanghai Library, well known at home and abroad, is China's largest provincial-level library. Of its collection, the over 1.7 million volumes of ancient documents are the most valuable and representative, including 25,000 titles of rare ancient books in 178,000 volumes, many being the only copies extant in the world. The oldest document dates back nearly 1,500 years.

The Peking University Library took over the collections of the Yanjing University Library in 1950 and by the mid-1980s – with more than 3 million volumes, one-fourth of them in foreign languages – was one of the best university libraries in the country. It is one of the earliest modern new libraries in China. Approved by the State Council as the first batch of national key ancient books protection unit, has developed into a resource rich, modern, comprehensive, open research library.

Major provincial libraries
 Anhui Library 
 Capital Library in Beijing
 Chongqing Library 
 Fujian Library 
 Gansu Library 
 Guangdong Library 
 Library of Guangxi Zhuang Autonomous Region 
 Guizhou Library 
 Hainan Library 
 Hebei Library 
 Heilongjiang Library 
 Henan Library 
 Hubei Provincial Library 
 Hunan Library 
 Library of Inner Mongolia Autonomous Region 
 Jiangxi Library 
 Jilin Library 
 Liaoning Library 
 Nanjing Library 
 Library of Ningxia Hui Autonomous Region 
 Qinghai Library 
 Shaanxi Library 
 Shandong Library 
 Shanghai Library 
 Shanxi Library 
 Sichuan Library 
 Tianjin Library 
 Tibet Autonomous Region Library 
 Library of Xinjiang Uygur Autonomous Region 
 Yunnan Library 
 Zhejiang Library

See also
Hong Kong Central Library
Chinese Library Classification (CLC)
Archives in the People's Republic of China
Boone Library School
Culture of the People's Republic of China
Education in the People's Republic of China

References

External links
National Science Library, Chinese Academy of Sciences (中国科学院国家科学图书馆) – functions as the key library nationally for collecting information resources and providing information services in natural sciences, inter-disciplinary fields, and high tech fields, for the researchers and students of Chinese Academy of Sciences and for the researchers around the country. 
Chinese Library Network – SinoLib.com
National Science and Technology Library of China – offers abundant science and technology related archive and information. Since 2002, the site upgraded to provide new services, such as Union Public Catalog, Periodical Catalog, and Experts Consult.
Tsinghua University Library  – Presents the homepage of the Tsinghua University Library. Includes introduction to the Library, its services, user's guide, feedback, news, online catalogs, web directories, electronic resources within and beyond the Library. Categorizes online libraries in China by province.
Peking University Library – Provides online access to its catalog and allows searching in English, Pinyin, and Chinese characters.
Zhejiang University Library – A system of 5 libraries that provides comprehensive access to the university's library holdings. ZJU Library is also the host of the China-America Digital Academic Library (CADAL).
Chinese Collection Asian Reading Room, U.S. Library of Congress

 
Educational organizations based in China